Heatwave was a rock festival held on August 23, 1980 at Mosport Park north of Bowmanville, Ontario.  The slogans used to promote the show were variously the "Punk Woodstock", the "New Wave Woodstock", or "The 1980s Big Beat Rock and Roll Party". The festival was noteworthy because of the importance of the headliner bands that played and the timing in the evolution of new wave music, and the size of the crowd.

History
The festival was noteworthy because of the importance of the headliner bands that played and the timing in the evolution of new wave music, and from the size of the crowd.  Tickets were $20 ($25 at the gate). 85,000 people attended but at 5 pm Dan Aykroyd, in character as Elwood Blues, during a live radio interview from backstage with friend and festival promoter John Brower, asked Brower if he could invite everyone listening to come out and be on his guest list. Brower immediately agreed and within 90 minutes another 15,000 people poured into the park swelling the crowd to almost 100,000 just as Talking Heads took the stage as the sun set. The crowd inched forward to accommodate the "guests" and a sense of wonder swept over everyone as no one other than Brower and Aykroyd and the radio audience was aware of the last minute free invitation. Scandal plagued the event with accusations tossed back and forth between the backers and park management, the latter claiming to have thrown away all the ticket stubs as "no one told them to keep them". The event reportedly lost a million dollars.

Despite the fact that no rights agreements were signed, the entire concert was recorded professionally. The tapes surfaced sometime later that year and were secured by Brower after being turned over by the studio whose recording truck had been on location to record Teenage Head, the band. In the mid 1990s the tapes were handed over to Canadian independent record executive Jan Haust by Brower to ensure their professional restoration and safe keeping. 102 of those tracks, by the five most famous of the bands, were acquired by Wolfgangs, which also holds the rights to Bill "Wolfgang" Graham's archive; by 2017 they were posted on its website. A video recording of a portion of the set played by The Kings has also been released.

At the time of the festival, a new wave/punk festival seemed a novel idea to many, especially as many of these bands typically played at night, in clubs—not outdoors in the hot summer sunlight. Rock magazine CREEM published an overview of Heatwave from that point of view, using a few words of parody in comparison to Woodstock.

It may bear further verification, but some remember The Ramones as being initially announced for the festival.

Groups 

The groups were:

 Vladymir Rogov (opening artist) with his band ARKITEX (not on poster)
 Teenage Head (not on poster)
 BB Gabor (not on poster)
 Holly and the Italians (not on the poster)
 Rockpile featuring Dave Edmunds and Nick Lowe
 The Rumour without Graham Parker (just after he had gone solo) (not on poster)
 The B-52's
 Talking Heads (at sundown)
 The Pretenders
 Elvis Costello and the Attractions 
 The Kings

The Clash were originally booked, and were on the poster, but cancelled or, by another story, were held up at the border due to customs.

A partial order of appearance was: Teenage Head (opened at 11:00 am), The Rumour, Rockpile, Holly and the Italians, Pretenders, B-52's, Talking Heads (sunset), Elvis Costello, and the Kings (midnight).

Teenage Head set list 

The reviewer saw "two scraggly guys playing guitar and bass, and a crop-haired singer in long-tailed livery coat and eyeliner. ... good ol' head-banging ramalama punk rock. A large and vocal following cheers them on, and they play with confidence, as if they belong up front of all those people." A year or so later, Teenage Head's live album had a picture from their Heatwave set on the cover. Their set included "Wild One" (from the Frantic City album).

 Top Down
 Wild One
 Picture My Face
 Some Kinda Fun
 Little Boxes (Alimony)
 Fist to Face (Everybody's Growin' Old)
 Let's Shake
 Lucy Potato
 Brand New Cadillac
 You're Tearing Me Apart
 Somethin' Else
 Kissin' The Carpet
 Disgusteen
 C'mon Everybody

The Pretenders set list 

The Pretenders played a full set at Heatwave photo and ticket.

 Precious
 The Adultress
 Kid
 Space Invader
 Private Life
 Brass in Pocket
 Stop Your Sobbing
 The Wait
 Louie Louie
 Porcelain
 Tattooed Love Boys
 Up the Neck
 Audience
 Mystery Achievement

The B-52's set list 

Performing the strongest material from their first album and debuting much of the Wild Planet material before the largest live audience they had experienced up to this point.

 Planet Claire
 6060-842
 Devil In My Car
 52 Girls
 Quiche Lorraine
 Dirty Back Road
 Lava
 Give Me Back My Man
 Strobe Light
 Private Idaho
 Runnin' Around
 Rock Lobster
 Dance This Mess Around
 Party Out of Bounds

Talking Heads set list 

The band that toured for the Remain in Light album, including Adrian Belew, performed for the first time at Heatwave as the sun was setting.  Their segment began with the four original members plus Belew, and then, as the songs progressed, they added musicians and vocalists, including Nona Hendryx (vocals), Busta Jones, Steve Scales, Dolette McDonald, and Bernie Worrell (keyboards).

 Psycho Killer
 Warning Sign
 Stay Hungry
 Cities
 I Zimbra
 Once in a Lifetime
 Houses in Motion
 Born Under Punches (The Heat Goes On)
 Crosseyed and Painless
 Life During Wartime
 Take Me to the River

Elvis Costello set list 

The Heatwave festival was the only 1980 live concert in North America by Elvis Costello and the Attractions.

 Shot With His Own Gun (sometimes listed as "How does it Feel"), accompanied only by Steve on piano *
 Accidents Will Happen
 The Beat
 Temptation
 (What's So Funny 'Bout) Peace, Love, and Understanding
 Mystery Dance
 Green Shirt
 You'll Never Be a Man
 (I Don't Want to Go to) Chelsea
 Secondary Modern
 Pump It Up
 Lover's Walk
 Less Than Zero
 Big Tears
 High Fidelity *
 Lipstick Vogue *
 Radio Radio
 I Can't Stand Up for Falling Down
 Alison
 Clubland
 Oliver's Army
 Watching the Detectives
 You Belong to Me *

Recorded and available as a two LP disk album. "Sounds like an audience recording..."

* may not be on all albums and order may be different

The Kings 

Their set started about midnight, and they played an hour long show which included "This Beat Goes On/Switchin' to Glide".
 Borrowing Time
 Don't Let Me Know
 Run Shoes Running
 My Habit
 This Beat Goes On/Switchin' to Glide
 Partyitis
 California Girls
 One Day Off
 Go Away

See also

List of historic rock festivals
List of punk rock festivals

References

Rock festivals in Canada
Music festivals in Ontario
Clarington
1980 in Canadian music
Electronic music festivals in Canada
Music festivals established in 1980
Punk rock festivals
New wave music
1980 music festivals